Sir Julian Bernard Knowles (born 26 January 1969) is a British High Court judge.

Educational and early life 
Knowles was born in Manchester and lived in Wythenshawe council estate. He was educated at comprehensives St John Plessington High School and Xaverian College. He studied at Balliol College, Oxford and completed a BA in mathematics in 1990. At Oxford he was offered a place to complete a DPhil in mathematics, but decided to pursue law after volunteering as a paralegal to help death row inmates in Oklahoma.

Career 
He was called to the bar at Inner Temple in 1994. At the bar, he specialised in criminal law and public law and practised from Matrix Chambers. He successfully represented the appellant in R v Jogee at the UK Supreme Court. He also appeared in the Pinochet extradition case and R v Huhne. In addition to practice, he was co-author of Nicholls, Montgomery, Knowles: The Law of Extradition and Mutual Legal Assistance in 2002 which was taken into a third edition and The Abolition of the Death Penalty in the United Kingdom: how it happened and why it still matters in 2015. He served as a recorder from 2009 to 2017 and took silk in 2011. In 2017, he was appointed a deputy High Court judge.

High Court appointment 
On 2 October 2017, he was appointed a judge of the High Court and assigned to the Queen's Bench Division. He took the customary knighthood in the same year.

Personal life 
In 2011, he married Dr Nicola Levitt, with whom he has one son. In his Who's Who entry, he listed his interests as "electronic dance music, looking in bookshops, lager, making bread". He is a supporter of Manchester City F.C.

References

Living people
1969 births
21st-century English judges
Knights Bachelor
Alumni of Balliol College, Oxford
Members of the Inner Temple
Queen's Bench Division judges
People educated at Xavier College
21st-century King's Counsel
English King's Counsel
Lawyers from Manchester
People from Wythenshawe